Goathurst is a small village and civil parish in the English county of Somerset, around 3 miles from the town of Bridgwater. The parish includes the hamlets of Andersfield and Huntstile. The village is on the route of the Samaritans Way South West.

History

Goathurst was part of the hundred of Andersfield.

Originally part of the Royal Forest of North Petherton, its first squire owned Goathurst's St Edward's church, a Grade I listed building which includes a 19th-century monument to three-year-old Isabella Kemeys, showing the child lying on a pillow holding a broken flower.

Goathurst was the location of a 300-person prisoner of war camp during World War II, initially housing Italian prisoners from the Western Desert Campaign, and later German prisoners following the Battle of Normandy.

Governance

The parish council has responsibility for local issues, including setting an annual precept (local rate) to cover the council's operating costs and producing annual accounts for public scrutiny. The parish council evaluates local planning applications and works with the local police, district council officers, and neighbourhood watch groups on matters of crime, security, and traffic. The parish council's role also includes initiating projects for the maintenance and repair of parish facilities, as well as consulting with the district council on the maintenance, repair, and improvement of highways, drainage, footpaths, public transport, and street cleaning. Conservation matters (including trees and listed buildings) and environmental issues are also the responsibility of the council.

The village falls within the Non-metropolitan district of Sedgemoor, which was formed on 1 April 1974 under the Local Government Act 1972, having previously been part of Bridgwater Rural District, which is responsible for local planning and building control, local roads, council housing, environmental health, markets and fairs, refuse collection and recycling, cemeteries and crematoria, leisure services, parks, and tourism.

Somerset County Council is responsible for running the largest and most expensive local services such as education, social services, libraries, main roads, public transport, policing and fire services, trading standards, waste disposal and strategic planning.

It is also part of the Bridgwater and West Somerset county constituency represented in the House of Commons of the Parliament of the United Kingdom. It elects one Member of Parliament (MP) by the first past the post system of election, and was part of the South West England constituency of the European Parliament prior to Britain leaving the European Union in January 2020, which elected seven MEPs using the d'Hondt method of party-list proportional representation.

See also
Halswell House
Robin Hood's Hut

References

External links

Location:  ST2534
Entry at Quantock online
British History online comprehensive background on Goathurst and Haswell House
Vision of Britain entry many statistics
Entry at GENUKI
History of the Poulett family
Archives Wales information on the Kemeys-Tynte family
John Salvatore Zuncheddu: story of the PoW camp
Map of Goathurst from Sedgemoor online

Villages in Sedgemoor
Civil parishes in Somerset